Cilveloy or Jilveloi, is a form of the Anatolian folk dance bar (dance). Georgian part of Acharuli dance. Cilveloy is a folk dance spread all over Artvin and Batum.

References

External links

Turkish dances
Dances of Georgia (country)